Power from Hell is the debut studio album by English thrash metal band Onslaught, released in February 1985. Apparently confusion has arisen as to who coined the term Death Metal, as it was Onslaught who wrote their song 'Death Metal' in early 1984 and recorded the album version later in the same year, Possessed who recorded their song entitled "Death Metal" on their 1984 demo tape of the same name. "Power from Hell" was reissued in 1996 by Powerage Records, again in 2005 by Blackend Records and received a full remaster by Jacob Hansen for the 2012 release on AFM Records; the 2012 release rectifies the track listing problem encountered on previous releases and has revamped artwork with liner notes by Steve Grice.

Track listing
All music by Onslaught. Lyrics written by Nige Rockett except where noted

Notes
 "Mighty Empress" contains part of O Fortuna
 The 25th anniversary release by AFM Records contains 2 re-recorded versions of "Thermonuclear Devastation of the Planet Earth" and "Power from Hell" from 2011

Personnel
 Paul Mahoney – vocals
 Nige Rockett – guitar
 Jase Stallard – bass
 Steve Grice – drums

Production
 Les Hunt – Producer
 Steve Woolley – Cover art
 Steve Grice – Art direction
 Des Parton – Engineering

References

1985 debut albums
Onslaught (band) albums